The Adam Revo was a city car made by the now dead Adam Motor Company of Pakistan. It was the first car to be designed and assembled in Pakistan and was launched in 2005. The name "REVO" was derived from the word revolution, which it was supposed to make. However, production stopped by September 2006 due to unavailability of funds and lack of government support. Only 600 cars were sold.

There were two variants available, equipped with two different Chinese made engines; the Revo 80 (0.8L) and Revo 105 (1.05L).

The Revo was envisaged to be between 10% and 15% cheaper than other local competitors, mainly the Mehran 800, which dominates Pakistan's automobile industry.

Specification
Engine
 Revo 80: 797 cc straight-4 OHC petrol engine with carburetor –  at 5500 rpm,  at 3000 rpm
 Revo 105: 1051 cc straight-4 OHC petrol engine with Fuel injection –  at 5500 rpm,  at 3000 rpm

Suspension
Front: Strut with Coil spring
Rear: Leaf spring with Shock absorber

Brakes
Front: Disc with booster
Rear: Drum

Drive Type
Front Engine Rear Wheel Drive (RWD).

Model ranges
 80std
 80s
 80+ (with CNG option)
 105i
 105i+ (with CNG option)
 105is
 105is+ (with CNG option)

References

External links
 Adam Motor Company Products Page
 Revo, Pakistan’s first ‘national’ car launched
 Interview of Feroz Khan, Maker of Pakistan's REVO
 Photographs of the REVO

City cars
Cars of Pakistan
Cars introduced in 2005